Mostafa Tayyebi (born 9 June 1987) is an Iranian professional futsal player.

Honours

Country 
 AFC Futsal Championship
 Champion (2): 2008 - 2010
 Asian Indoor Games
 Champion (2): 2007 - 2009

Club 
 Iranian Futsal Super League
 Champion (1): 2019–20 (Mes Sungun)

References

1987 births
Living people
Sportspeople from Mashhad
People from Mashhad
Iranian men's futsal players
Futsal forwards
Elmo Adab FSC players
Foolad Mahan FSC players
Firooz Sofeh FSC players
Shahid Mansouri FSC players
F.C. Aboomoslem players
Farsh Ara FSC players
Mes Sungun FSC players
Iranian expatriate futsal players
Iranian footballers
Association football midfielders
Iranian expatriate sportspeople in Iraq
21st-century Iranian people